Leamon Robinson Newcomb (28 November 1903 – 3 July 1964), known as Lem Newcomb, was an English footballer who played as a right half in the Football League for Darlington, Millwall and Southport. He was on the books of Middlesbrough without playing League football for them, and also played non-league football for Stillington Juniors, Stockton Malleable Institute and Sittingbourne.

In 1960, he took over as manager of Southport. Ill-health forced his retirement in March 1964, and he died in July of that year.

Notes

References

1903 births
1964 deaths
Footballers from County Durham
English footballers
Association football wing halves
Middlesbrough F.C. players
Darlington F.C. players
Sittingbourne F.C. players
Millwall F.C. players
Southport F.C. players
English Football League players
English football managers
Southport F.C. managers
English Football League managers
People from Stillington, County Durham